Alessandro Bignamini (born November 24, 1970) is an Italian comic book artist, mostly known for his work on Mister No, Brad Barron, Greystorm and Orfani series.

Biography
Bignamini was born in Milan, northern Italy.

After the artistic high school, he attended the Comics college in Milan (Scuola del Fumetto di Milano). He began professional career in 1990, drawing for magazines Fumo di China and Comic Art. Starting from 1992 he collaborated  with Intrepido, drawing several short stories. He also illustrated four episodes of the "Orazio Brown" series.

He became a staff artist in Sergio Bonelli Editore in 1994, working on Mister No, Brad Barron (since 2005), Graystorm (since 2009) and Orfani (2013) series.

References

External links
 Personal blog 
 Bignamini's interview with Davide Occhicone, Walter Troielli & Salvatore Cervasio. "Un 'BIG' alla corte di Sergio Bonelli: Alessandro Bignamini", Lo Spazio Bianco, dicembre 2010 

1970 births
Living people
Artists from Milan
Italian comics artists